Henri Marinho dos Santos (born 19 February 2002), commonly known as Henri, is a Brazilian footballer who currently plays as a defender for North Texas SC.

Career statistics

Club

References

2002 births
Living people
People from Araçatuba
Brazilian footballers
Brazil youth international footballers
Association football defenders
Sociedade Esportiva Palmeiras players
Footballers from São Paulo (state)